Equativ (formerly known as Smart AdServer) is a French advertising technology company. Created in 2001 as part of Aufeminin, it was bought by private-equity fund Cathay Capital in 2015, and then by private-equity fund Capital Croissance for a secondary LBO in 2021. It operates mostly in the USA, Europe, Latin America and Asia.

History 
Equativ was created in 2001 by aufeminin.com in order to manage advertisements on the publisher's websites. It became an independent company within the same group in 2005, then expanded locally and internationally

Axel Springer, the largest digital publishing house in Europe, bought AuFeminin in 2007. Following that take-over, Equativ expanded into Europe, Latin America and the United States. In 2015, Axel Springer sold the company to private equity fund Cathay Capital for 37 million €. In 2021 private equity fund Capital Croissance became the new majority shareholder of the company for a secondary LBO, in a bid to accelerate the development of the company in the United States and in connected TV.

The company operates an adserver, an SSP and a DSP and specializes in solutions for Advanced TV and premium publishers. As of 2022, the company operates on 4 continents with a management team split between Paris, New York and London.

Acquisitions 
In 2019, Equativ acquired LiquidM, a global Demand Side Platform (DSP) based in Berlin.

In 2021, Equativ acquired DynAdmic, a Cookie-Free CTV and Video Advertising Platform providing Managed DSP services.

In 2022, Equativ acquired Nowtilus, a German Advanced TV specialist.

See also 

 Supply-side platform
 Real-Time Bidding

References

Online advertising services and affiliate networks
Technology companies established in 2001
Companies based in Paris